The 1969–70 Bundesliga was the seventh season of the Bundesliga, West Germany's premier football league. It began on 16 August 1969 and ended on 3 May 1970. Bayern Munich were the defending champions.

Competition modus
Every team played two games against each other team, one at home and one away. Teams received two points for a win and one point for a draw. If two or more teams were tied on points, places were determined by goal difference and, if still tied, by goals scored. The team with the most points were crowned champions while the two teams with the fewest points were relegated to their respective Regionalliga divisions.

Team changes to 1968–69
1. FC Nürnberg and Kickers Offenbach were relegated to the Regionalliga after finishing in the last two places. They were replaced by Rot-Weiss Essen and Rot-Weiß Oberhausen, who won their respective promotion play-off groups.

Season overview
The 1969–70 season saw Borussia Mönchengladbach win their first title. Key to their success was a, in comparison to the previous seasons, significantly improved defense. Mönchengladbach successfully held off Bayern Munich despite a record season of Bayern striker Gerd Müller, who scored 38 goals.

At the other end of the table, 1860 Munich and Alemannia Aachen were demoted. The Munich side was forced to sell several key players because of financial problems, filling the voids with youth players. However, those players lacked Bundesliga capability, so relegation was a logical consequence. Meanwhile, Aachen had an even more disastrous year. Despite a second-place finish in 1968–69, the team was never able to provide even a rudimentary repeat of their level of play throughout the season, which eventually fixed their demotion several rounds before the end of the season.

The season in general was overshadowed by a very harsh winter. A total of 45 games had to be postponed because of frozen pitches and similar conditions between January and April 1970, including a complete round of games on 10 January 1970. As a consequence, many teams had severe scheduling problems. The situation was impaired by the upcoming World Cup, which was to begin only three weeks after the end of the season. Eventually, the table was evened up again, but only prior to the last two rounds of matches.

Other notable events were the cup victory of Regionalliga sides Kickers Offenbach (although the team had already been promoted by the time the final was played) and an incident in a game between rivals Borussia Dortmund and FC Schalke 04 where Schalke player Friedel Rausch was bitten into his rear by a shepherd. The dog had been used by local police to ensure that the pitch in Dortmund's Stadion Rote Erde was kept free of spectators, who gathered until the sidelines in a hopelessly overcrowded venue.

Team overview

League table

Results

Top goalscorers
38 goals
  Gerd Müller (FC Bayern Munich)

20 goals
  Werner Weist (Borussia Dortmund)

19 goals
  Klaus Fischer (TSV 1860 Munich)
  Herbert Laumen (Borussia Mönchengladbach)
  Johannes Löhr (1. FC Köln)

17 goals
  Uwe Seeler (Hamburger SV)

16 goals
  Bernd Rupp (1. FC Köln)

15 goals
  Franz Brungs (Hertha BSC)
  Hugo Dausmann (Rot-Weiß Oberhausen)

13 goals
  Wolfgang Gayer (Hertha BSC)
  Lorenz Horr (Hertha BSC)

Champion squad

See also
 1969–70 DFB-Pokal

References

External links
 DFB Bundesliga archive 1969/1970

Bundesliga seasons
1
Germany